Nanning Locomotive Depot (Chinese:南宁机务段) is a locomotive depot belong to Nanning Railway Bureau. It was founded in 1951.

Equipped models 

China Railways DF4B
China Railways DF4C
China Railways DF4D(4000 Series and 7000 Series)
China Railways DF5
China Railways DF7C
China Railways DF7G(5000 Series)
China Railways DF8B
China Railways HXN5B
China Railways SS7
China Railways SS7B
China Railways HXD1C

Dominated models 

China Railways SS7C
China Railways HXD1D
China Railways HXD3C
China Railways HXD3D

Subordinate Agencies 
Yulin Locomotive Area(Former Yulin Locomotive Depot)
Nanning South Locomotive Area
Baise Locomotive Area

See also 
Nanning Railway Station
Liuzhou Locomotive Depot

References

External links 

 The microblog of the Nanning Locomotive Depot_Sina Weibo(Chinese)

Rail transport in Guangxi
Buildings and structures in Nanning
Railway depots in China